Ellen Drew (born Esther Loretta Ray; November 23, 1914 – December 3, 2003) was an American film actress.

Early life
Drew, born in Kansas City, Missouri in 1914, was the daughter of an Irish-born barber. She had a younger brother, Arden. Her parents separated in 1931. She worked in multiple jobs and won a number of beauty contests before becoming an actress. Moving to Hollywood in an attempt to become a star, she was discovered while working at an ice cream parlor where one of the customers, actor William Demarest, took notice of her and eventually helped her get into films.

Career
Ray's venture into the movies brought about a conflict in names when she tried starting her career with the name Terry Ray, which happened to be the name of another Terry Ray, a male actor. A 1937 newspaper photo showed the resolution of the conflict as "They conferred, drew lots from the hat, and masculine Terry Ray became Terry Rains, while feminine Terry Ray remained as before." She later tried the name of Erin Drew.

After appearing in 25 features using her birth name, she became a fixture at Paramount Pictures officially as Ellen Drew from 1938 to 1944, where she appeared in as many as six films per year, including Sing You Sinners (1938) with Bing Crosby and The Lady's from Kentucky (1939) with George Raft. She moved to RKO in 1944.  Among her leading men were Ronald Colman, William Holden, Basil Rathbone, Dick Powell, and Robert Preston (in The Night of January 16th and Night Plane from Chungking).

Her films include Christmas in July (1940), Isle of the Dead (1945), Johnny O'Clock (1947), The Man from Colorado (1948), The Crooked Way (1949) and The Baron of Arizona with Vincent Price (1950). In the 1950s, with her movie career on the decline, she worked as a television actress. Among her final roles was the part of Julia Webberly in the 1960 Perry Mason episode, "The Case of the Larcenous Lady".

Radio
On June 23, 1943, Drew co-starred with Agnes Moorehead and Ted Reid in "Uncle Henry's Rosebush" on Suspense, and on July 25, 1943, she co-starred with Preston Foster in "China Bridge", a presentation of Silver Theater on CBS radio. She also appeared twice on the Kate Smith Hour.

Death
Drew died on December 3, 2003, in Palm Desert, California, of a liver ailment, aged 89. She was cremated and her ashes scattered at sea.

Honors
For her contributions to the motion picture industry, Drew was honored with a star on the Hollywood Walk of Fame in 1960, located at 6901 Hollywood Blvd.

In popular culture

A highly fictionalized version of her appears in James Ellroy's novels Perfidia and This Storm.

Partial filmography

 The Return of Sophie Lang (1936) as Secretary (uncredited)
 Rhythm on the Range (1936) as Party Guest (uncredited)
 Yours for the Asking (1936) (uncredited)
 My American Wife (1936) as Party Guest (uncredited)
 Hollywood Boulevard (1936) as Terry Ray - Casting Office Secretary (uncredited)
 Lady Be Careful (1936) as Girl in Sailboat
 Wives Never Know (1936) (uncredited)
 Murder with Pictures (1936) as Minor Role (uncredited)
 The Big Broadcast of 1937 (1936) as Telephone Girl
 Rose Bowl (1936) as Mary Arnold (uncredited)
 The Accusing Finger (1936) as Wife
 College Holiday (1936) as Dancer on Train (uncredited)
 Murder Goes to College (1937) as Lil
 The Crime Nobody Saw (1937) as Secretary (uncredited)
 Internes Can't Take Money (1937) as Nurse (uncredited)
 Make Way for Tomorrow (1937) as Usherette (uncredited)
 Turn Off the Moon (1937) as Minor Role (uncredited)
 Night of Mystery (1937) as Secretary
 Hotel Haywire (1937) as Switchboard Operator (uncredited)
 Mountain Music (1937) as Helen (uncredited)
 This Way Please (1937) as Chorus Girl (uncredited)
 The Buccaneer (1938) (uncredited)
 Scandal Street (1938) (uncredited)
 Dangerous to Know (1938) as Secretary
 Cocoanut Grove (1938) as Radio Station Receptionist (uncredited)
 You and Me (1938) as Cashier
 Sing, You Sinners (1938) as Martha Randall
 If I Were King (1938) as Huguette
 The Lady's from Kentucky (1939) as Penelope 'Penny' Hollis
 The Gracie Allen Murder Case (1939) as Ann Wilson
 The Escape (1939) as Reporter (uncredited)
 Geronimo (1939) as Alice Hamilton
 French Without Tears (1940) as Diana Lake
 Women Without Names (1940) as Joyce King
 Buck Benny Rides Again (1940) as Joan Cameron
 Christmas in July (1940) as Betty Casey
 Texas Rangers Ride Again (1940) as Ellen 'Slats' Dangerfield
 The Mad Doctor (1941) as Linda Boothe
 The Monster and the Girl (1941) as Susan Webster
 Reaching for the Sun (1941) as Rita
 The Parson of Panamint (1941) as Mary Malloy
 Our Wife (1941) as Babe Marvin
 The Night of January 16th (1941) as Kit Lane
 The Remarkable Andrew (1942) as Peggy Tobin
 My Favorite Spy (1942) as Teresa 'Terry' Kyser
 Star Spangled Rhythm (1942) as herself (uncredited)
 Ice-Capades Revue (1942) as Ann Porter
 Night Plane from Chungking (1943) as Ann Richards
 The Impostor (1944) as Yvonne
 And the Angels Sing (1944) (uncredited)
 That's My Baby! (1944) as Betty Moody
 Dark Mountain (1944) as Kay Downey
 China Sky (1945) as Louise Thompson
 Isle of the Dead (1945) as Thea
 Man Alive (1945) as Connie McBride
 Sing While You Dance (1946) as Susan Kent
 Crime Doctor's Manhunt (1946) as Irene Cotter
 Johnny O'Clock (1947) as Nelle Marchettis
 The Swordsman (1948) as Barbara Glowan
 The Man from Colorado (1948) as Caroline Emmet
 The Crooked Way (1949) as Nina Martin
 Davy Crockett, Indian Scout (1950) as Frances Oatman
 The Baron of Arizona (1950) as Sofia de Peralta – Reavis 'The Baroness'
 Stars in My Crown (1950) as Harriet Gray
 Cargo to Capetown (1950) as Kitty Mellar
 The Great Missouri Raid (1951) as Bee Moore
 Man in the Saddle (1951) as Nan Melotte
 Outlaw's Son (1957) as Ruth Sewall
 The Millionaire (TV series) episode "The Julia Conrad Story" (1959) as Julia Conrad, with co-star Robert Alda

References

External links

 
 Photographs and literature

1914 births
2003 deaths
Actresses from Kansas City, Missouri
People from Palm Desert, California
American film actresses
American television actresses
Paramount Pictures contract players
20th-century American actresses